Sir Joseph Ashe, 1st Baronet (16 February 1617 – 15 April 1686) was an English Whig politician and merchant.

He was born into a rising and prominent family of industrialists from Somerset, and was the third surviving son of James Ashe Esquire and his wife Grace Pitt, daughter of Richard Pitt. In London, Joseph took up his father's profession as a clothier to great success, and married Mary Wilson, the daughter of a local draper, later raising with her seven daughters and two sons.

During the Civil War, his brother in Parliament Edward was chairman of the committee responsible for confiscating Royalist estates, while Joseph himself was arrested on a charge of corresponding with the enemy, and may have been involved in an ordeal afterwards of funds being transferred to Charles II's exiled court in Antwerp. Nonetheless, he succeeded in avoiding further punishment, and during the final years of the Protectorate government, purchased the estate of Twickenham Meadows in the county of Middlesex, now known as Cambridge Park, where his family would remain for nearly a century. After the monarchy was restored, Joseph was called as a juryman in the regicide trials, where he was unsuccessfully challenged by the defence. On 19 September 1660, he was made a baronet of Twickenham for his earlier assistance to the Crown.

His career in Parliament began in 1661 when he ran for Heytesbury during the minority of his cousin William Ashe, and lost. He would return in 1670, successfully winning for the constituency of Downton, where he had leased a manor from the bishop of Winchester. His tenure lasted until 1685.

In addition to his estate in Twickenham, Sir Joseph also bought and refurbished property in other places such as Wayne, rarely inhabiting houses that he built up and owned as investment. In 1673, he founded the small grammar school of Burgh Manor in Downton which he later donated to be free. While probably disapproving of the East India Company early in his parliamentary career, he later became one of its largest investors, with his widow and trustees holding in it a total of £10,000 of stock.

Sir Joseph is reported to have died "very rich" on 15 April 1686, and was buried at Twickenham Church, recognized as a "great benefactor" of the parish. His surviving son James succeeded him in his baronetcy at 12 years old, later serving in Parliament for Downton from 1701 to 1705. His two daughters were bequeathed £7,000 each and his sons-in-law, William Windham and Sir Horatio Townshend, each received £100 in mourning.

References

1618 births
1686 deaths
Baronets in the Baronetage of England
People from Twickenham
English MPs 1661–1679
English MPs 1679
English MPs 1680–1681
17th-century English businesspeople